Mirza Abul Hassan Ispahani (1902-1981) was a Pakistani politician and diplomat who served as an ambassador of Pakistan to the United States.

Early life and family 
Born in the Persian-origin Ispahani family, he was educated at St John's College, Cambridge. He completed his Bar-at-Law in 1924 of the All India Muslim League held in Madras in April 1941.

During the 1990s, Mirza Zia Ispahani, the youngest son of Mirza Abul Hassan Ispahani, served as Pakistan Ambassador in Switzerland and Italy and is currently Ambassador-at-large with Minister of State status and visited Bangladesh on the instructions of PPP co-chairman Asif Ali Zardari. His granddaughter, Farahnaz Ispahani, served as a member of Pakistan's parliament and is the wife of Pakistan's former ambassador to United States, Hussain Haqqani and lived for some time in the same house in Washington as did her grandfather.

Career
He became a member of the Indian Constituent Assembly in 1946 and represented the Muslim League at the New York Herald Tribune Forum the same year.

After independence, he became Member Pakistan Constituent Assembly in 1947. Mr. Isphani toured the United States as personal representative of Jinnah and was ambassador to the United States from September 1947 to February 1952. He was Deputy Leader of Pakistan Delegation to UNO on Trade And Development in 1947. He was Vice Chairman Pakistan Delegation to U.N. Security Council on Kashmir issue and was High Commissioner to the UK from 1952 to 1954. He was Federal Minister for Industries and Commerce from 1954 to 1955. He was an Ambassador to Afghanistan in 1973–74.

Ispahani died in Karachi in 1981.

Books
He authored a number of books which include:
 
 The Case of Muslim India (1946)
 27 Days in China (1960) 
 Leningrad to Samarkand (1962) 
 Quaid-e-Azam Jinnah, as I Knew Him (1967)

References 

1902 births
1981 deaths
Pakistani politicians
Ambassadors of Pakistan to Afghanistan
Ambassadors of Pakistan to the United States
High Commissioners of Pakistan to the United Kingdom
Ispahani family
Alumni of St John's College, Cambridge
Pakistan Muslim League politicians
Pakistani people of Bengali descent
20th-century Bengalis
Expatriates of British India in the United Kingdom
Bengal MLAs 1937–1945